The 2019 Tour of the Alps was a road cycling stage race that took place in Austria and Italy between 22 and 26 April 2019. It was the 43rd edition of the renamed Giro del Trentino and was rated as a 2.HC event as part of the 2019 UCI Europe Tour.

Route

Teams
On 29 January 2019, the race's twenty competing teams were announced at the 2018–19 FIS Nordic Combined World Cup event in Seefeld in Tirol, Austria. These included five UCI WorldTeams, nine UCI Professional Continental teams, five UCI Continental teams and an Italian national team.

Stages

Stage 1
22 April 2019 — Kufstein (Austria) to Kufstein (Austria),

Stage 2
23 April 2019 — Reith im Alpbachtal (Austria) to Schenna (Italy),

Stage 3
24 April 2019 — Salurn (Italy) to Baselga di Pinè (Italy),

Stage 4
25 April 2019 — Baselga di Pinè (Italy) to Cles (Italy),

Stage 5
26 April 2019 — Kaltern (Italy) to Bolzano (Italy),

Classification leadership table
In the 2019 Tour of the Alps, four different jerseys were awarded. The general classification was calculated by adding each cyclist's finishing times on each stage. Time bonuses were awarded to the first three finishers on all stages: the stage winner won a ten-second bonus, with six and four seconds for the second and third riders respectively. The leader of the general classification received a fuchsia jersey; this classification was considered the most important of the 2019 Tour of the Alps, and the winner of the classification was considered the winner of the race.

The second classification was the sprints classification, the leader of which was awarded a red jersey. In the sprints classification, riders received points for finishing in the top three at intermediate sprint points during each stage. Points were awarded on a 6–4–2 scale for all stages.

There was also a mountains classification, for which points were awarded for reaching the top of a climb before other riders. Each of the ten climbs were categorised as either first, second, or third-category, with more points available for the more difficult, higher-categorised climbs. For first-category climbs, the top five riders earned points; on the other climbs, only the top three riders earned points. The leadership of the mountains classification was marked by a green jersey

The fourth jersey represented the young rider classification, marked by a white jersey. Only riders born after 1 January 1996 were eligible; the young rider best placed in the general classification was the leader of the young rider classification. There was also a classification for teams, in which the times of the best three cyclists in a team on each stage were added together; the leading team at the end of the race was the team with the lowest cumulative time.

References

External links
 

2019
2019 UCI Europe Tour
2019 in Italian sport
2019 in Austrian sport
April 2019 sports events in Europe